The 1957 USC Trojans football team represented the University of Southern California (USC) in the 1957 NCAA University Division football season. In their first year under head coach Don Clark, the Trojans compiled a 1–9 record (1–6 against conference opponents), finished in a tie for seventh place in the Pacific Coast Conference, and were outscored by their opponents by a combined total of 204 to 86.

Tom Maudlin led the team in passing with 48 of 100 passes completed for 552 yards, no touchdowns and eight interceptions. Rex Johnston led the team in rushing with 74 carries for 304 yards. Larry Boies was the leading receiver with 14 catches for 144 yards and no touchdowns.

No member of the 1957 Trojans received first-team honors on the 1957 All-Pacific Coast Conference football team.  Tackle Mike Henry received second-team honors from the conference coaches.

Schedule

References

USC
USC Trojans football seasons
USC Trojans football